Simon Widdup (born 10 November 1977, in Doncaster, Yorkshire, England) is an English first-class cricketer, who made eleven first-class appearances for Yorkshire County Cricket Club in 2000 and 2001, when he was a part of their County Championship winning squad.  He scored a total of 245 runs, with a career best of 44 at an average of 14.41.

References

External links
Cricinfo Profile

1977 births
Living people
Yorkshire cricketers
English cricketers
Cricketers from Doncaster
Yorkshire Cricket Board cricketers
English cricketers of 1969 to 2000
English cricketers of the 21st century